is a railway station on the Shinano Railway Line in the town of Miyota, Nagano, Japan, operated by the third-sector railway operating company Shinano Railway.

Lines
Miyota Station is served by the 65.1 km Shinano Railway Line, and is 13.2 kilometers from the starting point of the line at Karuizawa Station.

Station layout
The station consists of two ground-level opposed side platforms serving two tracks. The station is staffed.

Platforms

Adjacent stations

History
The station opened on 1 December 1888.

Passenger statistics
In fiscal 2011, the station was used by an average of 1,286 passengers daily.

Surrounding area
Miyota Post Office

See also
 List of railway stations in Japan

References

External links

  

Railway stations in Nagano Prefecture
Railway stations in Japan opened in 1888
Shinano Railway Line
Miyota, Nagano